The Landesliga Burgenland is the football division of the Austrian state of Burgenland. It is in the fourth highest division in Austrian  football for clubs of the Burgenland Football Association.

Mode
The league is made up of sixteen teams playing one home and one away match against each other. A season therefore comprises 30 match days.

The end of the season the champion is entitled to promotion into the third-class Austrian Regional League East. The number of teams that descend into the fifth-class divisions 2. Liga Nord, 2. Liga Mitte and 2. Liga Süd varies depending on the number of relegated Burgenland teams in the Regional League East. From 2. Liga Nord, 2. Liga Mitte and 2. Liga Süd respectively, one club advances into the Burgenland Landesliga.

2020–21 member clubs 

SC Bad Sauerbrunn
FC Deutschkreutz
SV Güssing
ASK Horitschon Unterpetersdorf
ASKÖ Klingenbach
ASK Kohfidisch
SV Leithaprodersdorf
UFC Markt Allhau
FSG Oberpetersdorf/Schwarzenbach
SV Oberwart/Rotenturm
SC/ESV Parndorf 1919
SC Pinkafeld
SC Ritzing
SV Sankt Margarethen
ASV Siegendorf

References

External links
 Official website - Burgenländischer Fussball Verband

Football competitions in Austria
Sport in Burgenland